Groote Kerk may refer to:
Groote Kerk, Galle, (built 1750), a Dutch Reformed church in Galle, Sri Lanka
Groote Kerk, Haarlem, (built 1479, became a cathedral 1559), a Protestant church and former Catholic cathedral in Haarlem, Netherlands
Groote Kerk, Cape Town (built 1841), a Dutch Reformed church in Cape Town, South Africa

See also
 Grote Kerk (disambiguation)